The  is a skyscraper located in Ōita, Ōita Prefecture, Japan. Construction of the 102-metre, 21-storey skyscraper was finished in 1998.

External links
  

1998 establishments in Japan
Commercial buildings completed in 1998
Ōita (city)
Skyscrapers in Japan
Buildings and structures in Ōita Prefecture